Plasma Bigscreen is a software project from KDE which contains an interface optimized for Smart TVs and other computers such as the Raspberry Pi which can be connected to large displays.

Software 
The desktop environment is based on KDE Plasma 5. Voice control is provided through integration with Mycroft AI. Plasma Bigscreen supports HDMI-CEC.

Availability 
Plasma Bigscreen is currently available as a KDE Neon-based image, or installable on postmarketOS.

See also 
 Plasma Mobile
 Mycroft (software)

References

External links 
 

Free and open-source software
KDE Plasma